Salt of the Earth is a 1954 American drama film written by Michael Wilson, directed by Herbert J. Biberman, and produced by Paul Jarrico. All had been blacklisted by the Hollywood establishment due to their alleged involvement in communist politics.

The drama film is one of the first pictures to advance the feminist social and political point of view. Its plot centers on a long and difficult strike, based on the 1951 strike against the Empire Zinc Company in Grant County, New Mexico. In the film, the company is identified as "Delaware Zinc", and the setting is "Zinctown, New Mexico". The film shows how the miners, the company, and the police react during the strike. In neorealist style, the producers and director used actual miners and their families as actors in the film.

Plot

Esperanza Quintero (Rosaura Revueltas) is a miner's wife in Zinc Town, New Mexico, a community which is essentially run and owned by Delaware Zinc Inc. Esperanza is thirty-five years old, pregnant with her third child and emotionally dominated by her husband, Ramon Quintero (Juan Chacón). We know from her concern about her onomásticos or día de mi/su santo or Name Day that it is the 12th November as that is the onomásticos of persons named Esperanza.

The majority of the miners are Mexican-Americans and want decent working conditions equal to those of white, or "Anglo" miners. The unionized workers go on strike, but the company refuses to negotiate and the impasse continues for months. Esperanza gives birth and, simultaneously, Ramon is beaten by police and jailed on bogus assault charges following an altercation with a union worker who betrayed his fellows. When Ramon is released, Esperanza tells him that he's no good to her in jail. He counters that if the strike succeeds they will not only get better conditions right now but also win hope for their children's futures.

The company presents a Taft-Hartley Act injunction to the union, meaning any miners who picket will be arrested. Taking advantage of a loophole, the wives picket in their husbands' places. Some men dislike this, seeing it as improper and dangerous. Esperanza is forbidden to picket by Ramon at first, but she eventually joins the line while carrying her baby.

The sheriff, by company orders, arrests the leading women of the strike. Esperanza is among those taken to jail. When she returns home, Ramon tells her the strike is hopeless, as the company will easily outlast the miners. She insists that the union is stronger than ever and asks Ramon why he can't accept her as an equal in their marriage. Both angry, they sleep separately that night.

The next day the company evicts the Quintero family from their house. The union men and women arrive to protest the eviction. Ramon tells Esperanza that they can all fight together. The mass of workers and their families proves successful in saving the Quinteros' home. The company admits defeat and plans to negotiate. Esperanza believes that the community has won something no company can ever take away and it will be inherited by her children.

Cast
Professional actors

 Rosaura Revueltas as Esperanza Quintero
 Will Geer as Sheriff
 David Bauer as Barton (as David Wolfe)
 Mervin Williams as Hartwell
 David Sarvis as Alexander

Non-professional actors

 Juan Chacón as Ramon Quintero
 Henrietta Williams as Teresa Vidal
 Ernesto Velázquez as Charley Vidal
 Ángela Sánchez as Consuelo Ruiz
 Joe T. Morales as Sal Ruiz

 Clorinda Alderette as Luz Morales
 Charles Coleman as Antonio Morales
 Virginia Jencks as Ruth Barnes
 Clinton Jencks as Frank Barnes
 Víctor Torres as Sebasatian Prieto

 E.A. Rockwell as Vance
 William Rockwell as Kimbrough
 Floyd Bostick as Jenkins
 and other members of Mine-Mill Local 890

Production

The film was called 'subversive' and blacklisted because the International Union of Mine, Mill and Smelter Workers sponsored it and many blacklisted Hollywood professionals helped produce it. The union had been expelled from the CIO in 1950, over the alleged domination of its leadership by communists.

Director Herbert Biberman was one of the Hollywood screenwriters and directors who refused to answer the House Committee on Un-American Activities in 1947 on questions of affiliation to the Communist Party USA. The Hollywood Ten were cited and convicted for contempt of Congress and jailed. Biberman was imprisoned in the Federal Correctional Institution at Texarkana for six months. After his release he directed this film. Other participants who made the film and were blacklisted by the Hollywood studios include: Paul Jarrico, Will Geer, Rosaura Revueltas, and Michael Wilson.

The producers cast only five professional actors. The rest were locals from Grant County, New Mexico, or members of the International Union of Mine, Mill and Smelter Workers, Local 890, many of whom were part of the strike that inspired the plot. Juan Chacón, for example, was in real life a union local president. In the film he plays the protagonist, who has trouble dealing with women as equals. The director was reluctant to cast him at first, thinking he was too "gentle", but both Revueltas and the director's sister-in-law, Sonja Dahl Biberman, wife of Biberman's brother Edward, urged him to cast Chacón as Ramon.

The film was denounced by the United States House of Representatives for its communist sympathies, and the FBI investigated the film's financing. The American Legion called for a nationwide boycott of the film. After its opening night in New York City, the film languished for 10 years because all but 12 theaters in the country refused to screen it.

By one journalist's account: "During the course of production in New Mexico in 1953, the trade press denounced it as a subversive plot, anti-Communist vigilantes fired rifle shots at the set, the film's leading lady Rosaura Revueltas was deported to Mexico, and from time to time a small airplane buzzed noisily overhead ... The film, edited in secret, was stored for safekeeping in an anonymous wooden shack in Los Angeles."

Reception

Critical response

With McCarthyism in full force at the time of release, the Hollywood establishment did not embrace the film.

Pauline Kael, who reviewed the film for Sight and Sound in 1954, panned it as a simplistic left-wing "morality play" and said it was "as clear a piece of Communist propaganda as we have had in many years."

Bosley Crowther, film critic for The New York Times, reviewed the picture favorably, both for its screenplay and direction, writing: "In the light of this agitated history, it is somewhat surprising to find that Salt of the Earth is, in substance, simply a strong pro-labor film with a particularly sympathetic interest in the Mexican-Americans with whom it deals....But the real dramatic crux of the picture is the stern and bitter conflict within the membership of the union. It is the issue of whether the women shall have equality of expression and of strike participation with the men. And it is along this line of contention that Michael Wilson's tautly muscled script develops considerable personal drama, raw emotion and power." Crowther called the film "a calculated social document". Michael Wilson, who worked under a nom de plume for some years afterwards, later won an Academy Award for the screenplay of Bridge on the River Kwai (1957).

The review aggregator Rotten Tomatoes reported that 100% of critics gave the film a positive review, based on eleven reviews.

Accolades
 Karlovy Vary International Film Festival: Best Actress: Rosaura Revueltas; Crystal Globe Award for Best Picture, Herbert J. Biberman, received Ex aequo also by True Friends. Karlovy Vary (Carlsbad), Czechoslovakia; 1954.
 Academie du Cinema de Paris: International Grand Prize; 1955.
 In 1992, the Library of Congress selected the film for preservation in the United States National Film Registry for being "culturally, historically, or aesthetically significant."
 The film is preserved by the Museum of Modern Art in New York City.

Later history

The film found an audience in both Western and Eastern Europe in the few years after its American release. The story of the film's suppression, as well as the events it depicted, inspired an underground audience of unionists, leftists, feminists, Mexican-Americans, and film historians. The film found a new life in the 1960s and gradually reached larger audiences through union halls, women's associations, and film schools. The 50th anniversary of the film saw a number of commemorative conferences held across the United States.

Around 1993, Massachusetts Institute of Technology linguistics professor and political commentator Noam Chomsky praised the film because of the way people were portrayed doing the real work of unions. According to Chomsky: "[T]he real work is being done by people who are not known, that's always been true in every popular movement in history...I don't know how you get that across in a film. Actually, come to think of it, there are some films that have done it. I mean, I don't see a lot of visual stuff, so I'm not the best commentator, but I thought Salt of the Earth really did it. It was a long time ago, but at the time I thought that it was one of the really great movies—and of course it was killed, I think it was almost never shown."

The "Salt of the Earth Labor College" located in Tucson, Arizona is named after the film. The pro-labor institution (not a college per se) holds various lectures and forums related to unionism and economic justice. The film is screened on a frequent basis.

Other releases

On July 27, 1999, a digitally restored print of the film was released in DVD by Organa through Geneon (Pioneer), and packaged with the documentary The Hollywood Ten, which reported on the ten filmmakers who were blacklisted for refusing to cooperate with the House Un-American Activities Committee (HUAC). This Special Edition with the Hollywood Ten film is still available through Organa at organa.com. In 2004, a budget edition DVD was released by Alpha Video. A laserdisc version was released by the Voyager Company in 1987 (catalog # VP1005L).

Because the film's copyright was not renewed in 1982, the film is now in the public domain.

Adaptations
The film has been adapted into a two-act opera called Esperanza (Hope). The labor movement in Wisconsin and University of Wisconsin–Madison opera professor Karlos Moser commissioned the production. The music was written by David Bishop and the libretto by Carlos Morton. The opera premiered in Madison, Wisconsin, on August 25, 2000, to positive reviews.

A documentary titled A Crime to Fit the Punishment, about the making of the film, was released in 1982 and was directed by Barbara Moss and Stephen Mack.

A drama film, based on the making of the film, was chronicled in One of the Hollywood Ten (2000). It was produced and directed by Karl Francis, starred Jeff Goldblum and Greta Scacchi, and was released in European countries on September 29, 2000.

A fictionalized account of the movie's production featured prominently in the Audible original podcast series, The Big Lie (2022). Based on source material written by Paul Jerrico, the production features voice performances from Jon Hamm, Kate Mara, Ana de la Reguera, Bradley Whitford, John Slattery, Giancarlo Esposito, and David Strathairn, and was written by John Mankiewicz and Jamie Napoli.

See also

 The Hollywood Ten, documentary film
 Jencks Act
 Jencks v. United States
 Labor history
 The Ladies Auxiliary of the International Union of Mine Mill and Smelter Workers

References

Notes

Bibliography
 
 Salt of the Earth: The Story of a Film, by Herbert J. Biberman. Harbor Electronic Publishing, New York (2nd edition, 2004): 1965. See: Cineaste review of book & Scott Henkel and Vanessa Fonseca. "Fearless Speech and the Discourse of Civility in Salt of the Earth." Chiricú, vol. 1, no. 1, 2016, pp. 19–38.

Further reading
 Caballero, Raymond. McCarthyism vs. Clinton Jencks. Norman: University of Oklahoma Press, 2019.

External links

 
 Salt of the Earth at Metacritic
 
 
 
 Salt of the Earth segment at NPR
 Salt of the Earth article and references for research by Michael Selig
 
Salt of the Earth Recovery Project website recovering Salt of the Earth

1954 films
1950s feminist films
1950s independent films
1950s political drama films
American black-and-white films
American independent films
American political drama films
Censored films
Crystal Globe winners
Film censorship in the United States
Film controversies in the United States
Films about the labor movement
Films directed by Herbert Biberman
Films scored by Sol Kaplan
Films set in mining communities
Films set in New Mexico
Films shot in New Mexico
Films with screenplays by Michael Wilson (writer)
History of labor relations in the United States
McCarthyism
Films about Mexican Americans
Films about mining
Social realism in film
1950s Spanish-language films
United States National Film Registry films
1954 drama films
1950s English-language films
1950s American films